John "Quig" Quigley is an American film director, producer, editor, and writer. His professional career began in music video production and directing in Detroit, Michigan, in the early 1990s.  Since then, Quigley has produced and directed music videos and audio-visual projects for artists including – Eminem, 50 Cent, Kid Rock, Christina Aguilera and Tori Amos. As founder and owner of the production company, Chrome Bumper Films, Quigley has also created and directed award-winning documentaries and commercials.

Career

DJ

Eminem
Mockingbird - Interscope Records

Documentary films
 Farewell from Moscow 
 Eminem - All Access Europe

DVDs
Farewell from Moscow

References

External links

American film directors
American music video directors
Living people
Year of birth missing (living people)